Machu Qichqa (Quechua machu old, old person, Chanka Quechua qichqa cliff, "old cliff", also spelled Machoccechcca) is a mountain in the Huancavelica Region in Peru, about  high. Machu Qichqa lies southwest of Yawarqucha and northwest of Wakan Q'allay.

References 

Mountains of Peru
Mountains of Huancavelica Region